Pete & Bas are a British hip hop duo based in London, formed in 2017. They are notable for the songs "The Old Estate", "Dents in a Peugeot", and their debut single, "Shut Ya Mouth".

The duo consists of two rap artists aged in their 70s. They released their first single in 2017 with "Shut Ya Mouth". They recorded the song after Pete discovered his enjoyment for hip hop when his granddaughter was playing rap music on his car radio. He told Bas about it, and they decided that it would be good fun to issue it on YouTube. It was an immediate success and went viral, so they continued to create new music. They have also done successful gigs and a concert tour in major UK cities. They have over 805,000 followers on Instagram.

The duo have collaborated with several other notable artists. Their single "The Old Estate" features the rapper M24, and has a video filmed on an estate in Rotherhithe, and Millwall football stadium, which Pete is at least a fan of.

Discography

Mixtapes

 Quick Little Mixtape (2021)

Singles

References

English hip hop groups
English musical duos
Musical groups from London
UK drill musicians
Hip hop duos